Alexander Stevenson Napier (born 8 August 1935) is a Scottish former footballer who played as an inside forward in the Scottish League for Raith Rovers, Montrose and Brechin City, and in the English Football League for Darlington.

Napier was born in Kirkcaldy in 1935. He played junior football for Dalkeith Thistle before joining Scottish League club Raith Rovers in February 1951. He joined Montrose on loan in February 1952, and remained with the club for the following season. He made one Division One appearance, on 14 November 1953 against Hearts at Tynecastle. When National Service commitments took him south of the border, he spent time with Darlington of the Football League Third Division North, for whom he made one first-team appearance, in a goalless draw with local rivals Hartlepools United on 17 December 1955. Napier signed for Brechin City in May 1956, and appeared twice in league competition before moving on to Nairn Thistle.

References

1935 births
Living people
Footballers from Kirkcaldy
Scottish footballers
Association football inside forwards
Dalkeith Thistle F.C. players
Raith Rovers F.C. players
Montrose F.C. players
Darlington F.C. players
Brechin City F.C. players
Scottish Football League players
English Football League players